Valeri Korb (born 3 July 1954 in Kohtla-Järve, Ida-Viru County) is an Estonian politician. He has been member of the XI, XII and XIII Riigikogu.

In 1999 he graduated from St. Petersburg State University of Service and Economics.

He was the mayor of Kohtla-Järve in three times: 1990-1991, 1996-1999 and 2002-2003.

Since 1997 he has a member of Estonian Centre Party.

References

Living people
1954 births
Estonian Centre Party politicians
Members of the Riigikogu, 2007–2011
Members of the Riigikogu, 2011–2015
Members of the Riigikogu, 2015–2019
Mayors of places in Estonia
People from Kohtla-Järve
Saint Petersburg University of Economics and Finance alumni